Rick Hearst (born January 4, 1965) is an American actor. He is known for roles in American soap operas.

Early life
Hearst was born Richard Charles Herbst on January 4, 1965, in Howard Beach, New York and raised in Dallas, Texas.

Personal life
Hearst has been married to wife Donna Smoot since June 9, 1990; they have two sons.

Career
His first film was Brain Damage, directed by Frank Henenlotter. He has appeared in Days of Our Lives (1989–1990) as Scott "Scotty" Banning II, Guiding Light (1990–1996) as Alan-Michael Spaulding, The Young and the Restless (2000–2001) as the sinister Matt Clark, and The Bold and the Beautiful (2002, 2009-2011) as Whipple "Whip" Jones III. Since 2002, he has appeared on General Hospital (2002–2009) as Ric Lansing. His last airdate was June 25, 2009. He returned to General Hospital February 24, 2014.

Hearst also had a recurring guest-star role on Beverly Hills, 90210, and has guest-starred on other TV series such as Jenny and Pacific Blue. In 2000, he starred as "Rocky" in the theater production of Aven'U Boys with Danica McKellar.

Hearst has been nominated for a Daytime Emmy Award seven times, winning for "Outstanding Supporting Actor in a Drama Series" in 2004 and 2007 for his General Hospital role, after previously winning "Outstanding Younger Actor in a Drama Series" for Guiding Light in 1991. He has also been nominated for four Soap Opera Digest Awards, winning "Outstanding Villain" for The Young and the Restless in 2001. In 2005, Hearst filmed the lead role in Carpool Guy, directed by Corbin Bernsen. As of 2012, Hearst holds the distinction of being the only living actor to have appeared on all four remaining soap operas.

Filmography

References

External links

Ric Lansing character profile on SoapCentral
Whipple Jones III character profile on SoapCentral
Matt Clark character profile on SoapCentral
Alan-Michael Spaulding character profile on SoapCentral
Scotty Banning character profile on SoapCentral

American male soap opera actors
American male television actors
Male actors from Dallas
1965 births
Living people
Daytime Emmy Award winners
Daytime Emmy Award for Outstanding Supporting Actor in a Drama Series winners
Daytime Emmy Award for Outstanding Younger Actor in a Drama Series winners
20th-century American male actors
21st-century American male actors